Schköna is a village and a former municipality in Wittenberg district in Saxony-Anhalt, Germany. Since January 1, 2011, it is part of the town Gräfenhainichen. It was part of the administrative community (Verwaltungsgemeinschaft) of Tor zur Dübener Heide since January 1, 2005.

Geography and transport
Schköna lies about 9 km southeast of Gräfenhainichen and about 13 km from Bad Düben, in the middle of the Düben Heath, putting the community within the Düben Heath Nature Park. Through the community runs Federal Highway (Bundesstraße) B 107.

History
Schköna had its first documentary mention in the Meißen Bishopric Register of 1346 under the name Skogen. This placename, Skogen, is of Slavic origin, but its meaning is unknown. In the Thirty Years' War, Schköna was utterly destroyed by the Swedes, as were many places in the region. The church was only built anew in 1670.

In 1950, nearby Hohenlubast was amalgamated with Schköna.

Subdivisions
Schköna has one of these: Hohenlubast.

Sightseeing
Church in Hohenlubast
Stately home in Schköna
Wilhemsgrube, a small, former strip mine where brown coal was mined.

References

External links
Gemeinde Schköna
Düben Heath Nature Park

Former municipalities in Saxony-Anhalt
Gräfenhainichen